Janet Hinshaw Caird (24 April 1913 – 20 January 1992) was a teacher and a 20th-century writer of Scottish mysteries, poems, and short stories.  Daughter of Peter Kirkwood, a missionary, and Janet Kirkwood, she was born in Livingstonia, Malawi, and educated in Scotland.  She attended Dollar Academy in Dollar, Clackmannanshire, and the University of Edinburgh, graduating with a Master of Arts in English literature in 1935 before further study at the University of Grenoble and the Sorbonne in 1935–36.

She married James Bowman Caird in 1938, and they had two daughters. She taught English and Latin at Park School for Girls in Glasgow in 1937–38, at Royal High School, Edinburgh in 1940–41, and at Dollar Academy from 1941 to 1943.  After several years at home, she returned to teaching at Dollar Academy in the 1950s before moving to Inverness in 1963.

Her novel for children, Angus the Tartan Partan, was published in 1961, followed by five murder mysteries set in Scotland and an historical novel, The Umbrella Maker's Daughter (1980), set in Dollar. Her three books of poetry appeared between 1977 and 1988.  Caird also wrote short stories for publication in periodicals and anthologies, and she wrote reviews and critical articles for Cencrastus, Chapman, Scottish Literary Journal, and other publications.

Caird was a member of the Royal Overseas League, the Society of Authors, and the Society of Antiquaries of Scotland, and she was president of the Inverness Association of University Women. Caird died in Inverness in 1992.

Bibliography

Mysteries
 Murder Reflected (1965) ; reprinted as In a Glass Darkly (1965) 
 Perturbing Spirit (1966) 
 Murder Scholastic (1967) 
 The Loch (1968) 
 Murder Remote (1973) ; reprinted as The Shrouded Way (1973)

Poetry
 Some Walk a Narrow Path (1977) 
 A Distant Urn (1983) 
 John Donne You Were Wrong (1988)

Juvenile
 Angus the Tartan Partan (1961)

Other
 The Umbrella Maker's Daughter (1980) 
 The Poetry of Violet Jacob and Helen B. Cruickshank, in Parker, Geoff (ed.), Cencrastus No. 19, Winter 1984, pp. 32 – 34, 

Some of Caird's notebooks and manuscripts are held by the National Library of Scotland in Edinburgh. Other notebooks are held by Boston University in the United States.

Reviews
 Hendry, Joy (1984), Distant Urn, a review of A Distant Urn, in Parker, Geoff (ed.), Cencrastus No. 18, Autumn 1984, p. 47,

References

Further reading
 McCulloch, Margery Palmer, Late Starters and Early Finishers: The Predicament of Women Writers, in Ross, Raymond (ed.), Cencrastus No. 52, Summer 1995, pp. 26 – 29, 

1913 births
1992 deaths
People educated at Dollar Academy
20th-century British women writers
Women mystery writers
Scottish mystery writers
20th-century Scottish poets
Scottish children's writers
20th-century Scottish novelists
Alumni of the University of Edinburgh
Scottish historical novelists
Scottish women novelists
Grenoble Alpes University alumni
British expatriates in France
Scottish schoolteachers
University of Paris alumni
20th-century Scottish women
British expatriates in Malawi